Colleen Moffit (born October 28, 1969) is an American businesswoman and author. She is the co-founder of Communiqué PR, a public relations firm and the co-author of Strategic Public Relations: 10 Principles to Harness the Power of PR.

Early life and education
Moffitt graduated from University of Puget Sound bachelor's degree in Psychology and a minor in Business in 1991.

Career
Before co-founding Communiqué PR, Moffitt worked for RealNetworks and Microsoft.

Book
Strategic Public Relations: 10 Principles to Harness the Power of PR (Xlibris, 2010),

References

External links

Living people
Businesspeople from Seattle
Writers from Seattle
University of Puget Sound alumni
Year of birth missing (living people)